Maphis is a surname. Notable people with the surname include:
Joe Maphis (1921-1986), American country music guitarist, husband of Rose
Rose Lee Maphis (1922-2021), American country music singer, wife of Joe

See also
John Miley Maphis House, historic house near Edinburg, Shenandoah County, Virginia, United States